Worth's Block, also known as the Gator Club, is a historic building in Sarasota, Florida. It is located at 1490 Main Street. It was added to the U.S. National Register of Historic Places in 1998.

It is a two-story  by  masonry commercial building built in 1912 and modified at different times, including in 1928.  Its ground floor was designed for commercial purposes and its second floor was for a residence.  As of 1998 its front (north) facade had been restored to its 1912 appearance, with a storefront plus, on the second story, "two sets of paired windows set in segmental arch brick surrounds."

History 
In 1903, William Worth moved to Sarasota from Englewood, Florida and purchased a piece of land on the intersection of Lemon Street and Main Street. William Worth was an early member of the Sarasota community, serving as its first tax collector and the first person to run for the office of mayor, but lost to A. B. Edwards in a 108–63 vote. In 1912, Worth's son William David Worth bought his father's business mercantile business and hired his uncle Enoch E. Worth to help him.

Gallery

References

External links
 Sarasota County listings at National Register of Historic Places
 Worth's Block at Florida's Office of Cultural and Historical Programs

Buildings and structures completed in 1928
National Register of Historic Places in Sarasota County, Florida
Buildings and structures in Sarasota, Florida